The Gay Amigo  is a 1949 American Western film starring Duncan Renaldo in the lead role of The Cisco Kid.  This film was one entry in a series of Cisco Kid B Westerns produced by Philip N. Krasne. Ziv Television Programs later advanced money to Krasne in order to purchase the television rights for the Cisco Kid.  Krasne later produced The O. Henry Playhouse.

Plot
Cisco and Pancho are at the border of the Arizona Territory and Mexico where they see a platoon of U.S. Cavalry pursuing what looks to be a band of bandidos. Escaping to Mexico, one of the bandidos falls off his horse. Cisco and Pancho see that not only is he dead, but he is actually a Norteamericano in charro costume. Cisco and Pancho use the U.S. Army, the local newspaper, a bar girl and a variety of respectable American citizens by playing them off against each other to discover the Americans attempting to blame Mexicans for stopping Arizona Statehood.

Cast
 Duncan Renaldo as The Cisco Kid
 Leo Carillo as Pancho
 Armida as Rosita
 Fred Kohler Jr. as Brack
 Clayton Moore as Lieutenant
 Fred Crane as Henchman Duke

References

External links

1949 films
Films directed by Wallace Fox
1949 Western (genre) films
United Artists films
American Western (genre) films
Adaptations of works by O. Henry
Cisco Kid
Films scored by Albert Glasser
American black-and-white films
1940s English-language films
1940s American films